Calligrapha elegantula is a species of beetles in the subfamily Chrysomelinae (a subfamily of leaf beetles). It is found in Costa Rica.

References

External links 
 
 Calligrapha elegantula at insectoid.info

Beetles described in 1877
Chrysomelinae
Beetles of Central America